Rozložná is a village and municipality in the Rožňava District in the Košice Region of middle-eastern Slovakia.

History
In historical records the village was first mentioned in 1241.

Geography
The village lies at an altitude of 306 metres and covers an area of 12.589 km².
It has a population of about 200 people.

Culture
The village has a public library.

External links
 Rozložná
https://web.archive.org/web/20071116010355/http://www.statistics.sk/mosmis/eng/run.html

Villages and municipalities in Rožňava District